Beyond Culture is a 1976 book by the American anthropologist Edward T. Hall.

High vs. low context culture

Extension transference

Notes

External links 
 The Grip of Culture: Edward T. Hall - a faithful synopsis by Sergio Missana covering: 
 The Silent Language (1959)
 The Hidden Dimension (1966)
 Beyond Culture (1976) 
 Everett M. Rogers, William B. Hart, and Yoshitaka Miike (2002), Edward T. Hall and The History of Intercultural Communication: The United States and Japan 
Gary Huang (1997), Beyond Culture: Communicating with Asian American Children and Families at Teachers College, Columbia University

1976 non-fiction books
Anthropology books
Educational administration
Doubleday (publisher) books